Thomas Potts was an English law clerk, and the author of the Discoverie of Witches.

Life 
Thomas Potts was brought up under the care of Sir Thomas Knyvet, Lord Knyvet of Escrick. He adopted the legal profession, and resided in Chancery Lane. In 1612 he went as clerk on circuit with Sir James Altham and Sir Edward Bromley, barons of the exchequer, and officiated at the trial of the famous Lancashire witches at Lancaster on 12 August. He was subsequently granted (17 April 1618) the office of collector of forfeitures on the laws concerning sewers.

Work 

During the trial of the witches, at the judges' request he compiled an account of the proceedings, which Bromley corrected before publication. It appeared in the following year under the title The Wonderfull Discoverie of Witches in the Countie of Lancaster, London, 1613, 4to.  

In the dedication to Sir Thomas Knyvet, Potts speaks of it as the first fruit of his learning. The work was reprinted by Sir Walter Scott in Somers Tracts, 1810, and again by the Chetham Society in 1845, with an introduction by James Crossley. Scott refers to it in his Letters on Demonology and Witchcraft, and it furnished the groundwork of Harrison Ainsworth's Lancashire Witches, in which Potts is a prominent character.

References

Sources 

 Ainsworth, William Harrison (1854). The Lancashire Witches: A Romance of Pendle Forest. London: George Routledge & Co.
 Crossley, James, ed. (1845). Potts's Discovery of Witches in the County of Lancaster. (Chetham Society). Manchester: Charles Simms and Co. pp. iii–lxxix.
 
 Green, Mary Anne Everett, ed. (1858). Calendar of State Papers, Domestic Series, of the Reign of James I, 1611–1618. London: Longman, Brown, Green, Longmans, & Roberts. p. 535.
 Hazlitt, William Carew (1867). Hand-book to the Popular, Poetical and Dramatic Literature of Great Britain. London: John Russell Smith. p. 325.
 Scott, Walter (1830). Letters on Demonology and Witchcraft. London: John Murray. pp. 249–250.
 Scott, Walter, ed. (1810). Somers Tracts: A Collection of Scarce and Valuable Tracts. Vol. 3. London: T. Cadell and W. Davies. pp. 95–160. 

Attribution:

 

17th-century English writers